Hamilton "Hammy" McMillan (born 13 July 1963) is a Scottish curler and world champion. He won a gold medal as skip for the Scottish team at the 1999 Ford World Curling Championships in Saint John, New Brunswick. He has received five gold medals at the European Curling Championships. He played third for the Tom Brewster rink before forming his own team.

He competed for Great Britain at the 1992 Winter Olympics and the 2002 Winter Olympics.

McMillan is the co-owner and manager of the Craignelder Hotel in Stranraer and is a keen golf player. He lives in Stranraer. His son, Hammy McMillan Jr. is also a competitive curler.

References

External links
 
 

1963 births
Living people
Scottish male curlers
British male curlers
Olympic curlers of Great Britain
Curlers at the 1992 Winter Olympics
Curlers at the 2002 Winter Olympics
World curling champions
European curling champions
Continental Cup of Curling participants
People from Stranraer